Federal elections were held in Switzerland on 26 October 1975. The Social Democratic Party emerged as the largest party in the National Council, winning 55 of the 200 seats. As of 2019, this is the last time turnout has reached 50% in a federal election.

Results

National Council

By constituency

Council of the States

References

Switzerland
1975 in Switzerland
Federal elections in Switzerland
October 1975 events in Europe
Federal